The 1982–83 Elitserien season was the eighth season of the Elitserien, the top level of ice hockey in Sweden. 10 teams participated in the league, and Djurgardens IF won the championship.

Standings

Playoffs

External links
 Swedish Hockey League official site

Swedish Hockey League seasons
1982–83 in Swedish ice hockey
Swedish